Putt Jattan De is a 1983 Punjabi film produced by Devinder Singh Gill and Iqbal Dhillon and directed by Jagjit Gill. It starred Daljeet Kaur and Baldev Khosa with Hindi stars Shatrughan Sinha and Dharmendra making special appearances. Surinder Shinda and Mohammad Sadiq were playback singers and acted as well.

Cast

Shatrughan Sinha ... Jagat Singh ‘Jagga’ Sarpanch
Baldev Khosa ... Sukha
Daljeet Kaur ... Paali
Prakash Gill ... Jageera
Dharmendra ... Chaudhary Dharam Singh 
Rehana Sultan ... Jagat Singh's Wife
Girija Mitra ... Pyaaro- Paali's  friend
Surinder Shinda ... Shinda (first appearance)
Mehar Mittal ... Baalam Pardesi
Mohammad Sadiq ... Jabar Jang Singh
Gugu Gill ... Cameo appearance
Gopi Bhalla ... Chacha Amli
Ved Goswami ... Qaidon- Paali's Chacha 
Sangeeta Mehta ... Saidan Jogan
 Rupinder Gill ... Thanedaar
Laj Bedi ... Jagga's mother
Surinder Walia ... Choorhi Wala
Saroop Parinda ... Baalam's associate
 Makhan Singh ... Sajjan Singh- Paali's father

References

External links

Punjabi-language Indian films
1980s Punjabi-language films
1983 films
1983 action films
Indian action films